King George's Medical University is a medical school, hospital, and medical university located in Lucknow, Uttar Pradesh, India. The medical school was raised to a medical university by an act passed by the government of Uttar Pradesh on 16 September 2002. It is the only government medical institution to have been awarded the NAAC A+ grade in the state of Uttar Pradesh.

The university has about 1250 undergraduate students (including 280 dental students) and 450 postgraduate students.

About 250 students a year are admitted to the four-and-a-half-year course of study for the degree of M.B.B.S.

History
King George V, then the Prince of Wales, laid the foundation stone of King George's Medical College in 1906. The college opened its gates in 1911, though the official opening ceremony was delayed to January 1912. The college was directly under the Government of the United Provinces, and degrees were awarded through Allahabad University. In 1921, the college was transferred to Lucknow University.

In 2002 the Government of Uttar Pradesh, led by Mayawati of the Bahujan Samaj Party (BSP), granted university status the college and renamed it Chhatrapati Shahuji Maharaj Medical University (CSMMU), under the Uttar Pradesh Chhatrapati Shahuji Medical University Act, 2002. In August 2003 Mulayam Singh Yadav of the Samajwadi Party (SP) replaced Mayawati and became Chief Minister of Uttar Pradesh. Two months later, in October 2003, the name of the university was changed to King George's Medical University (KGMU) by the Uttar Pradesh Chhartrapati Shahuji Maharaj Medical University (Second Amendment) Act, 2003.

Name-changing continued. In 2007, after the BSP won the Uttar Pradesh Legislative Assembly election and Mayawati returned to office, the name of the institution reverted to CSMMU. When control returned to the SP in the 2012 election, Akhilesh Yadav's government returned the name of the university the current "King George Medical University".

Similar changes occurred for the dental faculty. The faculty was established in 1949 as a section of the ENT department; raised to a separate department in 1950, it moved to a new building in 1952. When the university was established in 2002, the dental department became the Dental College, a constituent college of the university. Two years later, under the Uttar Pradesh King George's University of Dental Science Act, 2004, the Dental College was raised to the status of a state university named the "U.P. King George’s University of Dental Science". In 2007, the government reverted this decision and the U.P. King George's University of Dental Science again became simply a Faculty of Dental Sciences, as it was at the establishment of the university.

Faculties and institutes
 Faculty of Medical Sciences
 Faculty of Dental Sciences
 Institute of Paramedical Sciences
 Institute of Nursing

Undergraduate courses 
The college offers the four and a half year M.B.B.S. course with a one-year compulsory rotating internship. There are 250 seats for MBBS and 51 seats for BDS, which are filled through NEET exam.

Postgraduate and doctoral courses 
There are more than 28 PG courses and 13 Doctoral courses in KGMU. Thus almost all the branches of medicine and dental have a training program at KGMU. Diploma and PG diploma courses are also available in the institute.

Rankings

The National Institutional Ranking Framework (NIRF) has ranked the university 39 among universities in India in 2021, 9 among medical colleges and 60 overall. It was ranked fourth among government medical colleges in India in 2022 by Outlook India.

Notable people
The University has a long list of its prestigious alumni who have earned name and fame throughout the country as well as in abroad. As of now, the University has given 1 Padma Vibhushan, 6 Padma Bhushan, 29 Padma Shri and 45 BC Roy awardees to the nation.

Notable alumni

 Belle Monappa Hegde
 B. K. Anand
 Sanduk Ruit
 Rajendra Prasad
 Ravi Kant
 Anil Kohli
 Nuzhat Husain
 Mahesh Prasad Mehray
 Ravindra Nanda
 Autar Singh Paintal
 Sunil Pradhan
 Krishan Chandra Singhal
 Badri Nath Tandon
 Mahdi Hasan
 Naresh Trehan
 Prem Nath Wahi
 Shyam Swarup Agarwal
 Balram Bhargava
 Priyadarshi Ranjan
 Soniya Nityanand

Notable faculty

 Shyam Swarup Agarwal
 Mahendra Bhandari
 U. C. Chaturvedi
 Saroj Chooramani Gopal
 Mansoor Hasan
 Rajendra Prasad
 Ravi Kant
 Shiv Narain Kureel
 M. C. Pant
 Jagdish Narain Sinha
 Trilok Chandra Goel
 Nuzhat Husain

See also

 Medical college in India
 Healthcare in India
 Sanjay Gandhi Postgraduate Institute of Medical Sciences
Atal Bihari Vajpayee Medical University
 Uttar Pradesh University of Medical Sciences
 Dr. Ram Manohar Lohia Institute of Medical Sciences

References

External links
 

 
Medical and health sciences universities in India
Medical colleges in Uttar Pradesh
Universities and colleges in Lucknow
Universities in Uttar Pradesh
1905 establishments in India
Educational institutions established in 1905